The MCRD San Diego Command Museum is located in Day Hall, Building 26, Marine Corps Recruit Depot San Diego, San Diego, California.  It exhibits historical items relating to the United States Marine Corps.  The museum opened on November 10, 1987, and was officially designated as a command museum on January 8, 1993.

See also
United States Marine Corps Boot Camp

Notes

External links
MCRD San Diego Command Museum official website
Marine Corps Recruit Depot San Diego official website
United States Marine Corps official website

Marine Corps museums in the United States
Military and war museums in California
Museums in San Diego
Museums established in 1987
1987 establishments in California